The 2012–13 BSC Young Boys season is the 115th season in club history.

Review and events

Matches

Legend

Friendly matches

Preseason

Friendlies (fall)

Winter break

Friendlies (spring)

Super League

Kickoff times are in CET

League fixtures and results

League table

Swiss Cup

Kickoff times are in CET

UEFA Europa League

Qualifying rounds

Second qualifying round

Third qualifying round

Playoff round

Group stage

Squad information

Squad and statistics

Transfers

Sources

Young Boys
Young Boys
BSC Young Boys seasons